Baltimore and Ohio 4500 is a 2-8-2 "USRA Light Mikado" steam locomotive built by the Baldwin Locomotive Works in Philadelphia, Pennsylvania in July 1918 for the Baltimore and Ohio Railroad (B&O) as a member of the Q-3 class.

The locomotive hauled freight for the B&O until retirement in August 1957 and was donated for display at the B&O Railroad Museum in Baltimore, Maryland. It is the sole surviving Baltimore and Ohio Mikado type steam locomotive.

History

The locomotive was the very first USRA locomotive built and it was constructed in just twenty days. It was also finished on July 4, 1918, and it was decked out with American Flags for the occasion. While it has mostly remained as built mechanically, it received some of B&O's distinctive cosmetic changes throughout its service life, but the locomotive retains the original tender and trailing truck. During its service life, the locomotive was in freight service primarily on the Ohio and St. Louis divisions of the railroad.

The Baltimore & Ohio Railroad No. 4500 is a class Q3 2-8-2 'Mikado' type steam locomotive, built by the Baldwin Locomotive Works in 1918. Following America's entry into WWI, the USRA nationalised the nation's railroad system in the interest of ensuring the most efficient operations possible. Ironically, WWI was almost over when #4500 was ready for service on 4 July 1918. Like the other USRA designs, #4500 was sturdy, functional and popular with maintenance and locomotive crews. It was also popular with the railroad companies, and a total of six hundred and forty-one copies of the type were produced by different US railroads in the years following the war.

The B&O Q-3s were the first USRA Light Mikados built, and the first USRA engine of any type built. 100 of them were built from July 1918 to February 1919. They had 63 inch driving wheels, a tractive effort of 53,699 lbs, and 200 psi boiler. Their tenders could hold up to 10,000 gallons of water and 16 tons of coal. According to locomotive crews, they described these engines as sturdy, functional, very comfortable, and easy riding as their popularity with the engine crews grew. In 1957, the B&O renumbered the engines from the 4500 - 4599 range to the 300 - 399 range to make way for some new diesels that were being renumbered. In 1956, the first of the Q-3s were retired from service and after the 1957 renumbering, they began dropping like flies.

No. 4500 operated on the B&O's Ohio Division mainly hauling freight until it was retired from service in 1957, and it was donated to the B&O Railroad Museum in 1960 where it is placed on static display today. In 1957, the locomotive was renumbered 300 to make room for four-digit diesel locomotives.

Preservation
In August 1957, 4500, still numbered 300, was retired. In 1964 it was purchased, along with B&O 5300, for safe keeping and eventual donation by Ed Striegel of Striegel Supply & Equipment Corp., a business on Chemical Road in Curtis Bay, MD. Mr. Striegel bought railroad equipment for parting out and future sales to other railroads, this though was not the case for 5300 and 4500. Upon Mr. Striegel's death, the Baltimore Sun wrote, "In the 1950s, while visiting a storage lot for decommissioned B&O steam engines, Mr. Striegel discovered two historically significant locomotives - the President Washington, No. 5300, the high-wheeling Pacific Class that had pulled such classic trains as the Capitol Limited; and a 2-8-2 Mikado Class locomotive that had been built in 1918. He salvaged them and donated them to the B&O; Railroad Museum. 'They are the linchpins of our collection,' said Courtney B. Wilson, executive director of the museum. 'Ed saved two significant pieces for the museum and, without his help, they would have been lost forever,' he said. 'In my opinion, he was a phenomenal Baltimorean. He was a quiet, unassuming and a very generous guy. The museum was his favorite place to come and he was always looking for ways to improve and enhance its collections,' Mr. Wilson said." In 1990, the locomotive was designated as a National Historic Mechanical Engineering Landmark by the American Society of Mechanical Engineers. Today, it still resides there on display alongside 4-6-2 No. 5300."

References

4500
2-8-2 locomotives
Baldwin locomotives
Freight locomotives
USRA locomotives
Railway locomotives introduced in 1918
4500
Individual locomotives of the United States
Standard gauge locomotives of the United States
Steam locomotives of the United States
Preserved steam locomotives of Maryland
Historic Mechanical Engineering Landmarks